Facedown Records is a Christian rock record label based in Fallbrook, California that is devoted to hardcore punk and metalcore bands (Christian and secular) with a few death metal acts such as Immortal Souls and Indwelling. Founded by No Innocent Victim drummer Jason Dunn in 1997, the label started small with a number of 7" record releases by Overcome, Dodgin Bullets, and Born Blind. As the label grew, it was able to sign artists for full album deals. xDISCIPLEx released material on Facedown, as well as Figure Four and Point of Recognition. The label also signs straight edge groups such as xDEATHSTARx and xLooking Forwardx.

Label bands like Seventh Star and Nodes of Ranvier released well-received albums. War of Ages, For Today, Sleeping Giant and others make up the self-described "Facedown Family".

Strike First Records

Strike First Records is Facedown's imprint label, which provides label services for smaller bands, and sometimes acts as a "Facedown training ground"; some Strike First bands, such as Bloody Sunday, Kingston Falls, Call to Preserve, and War of Ages have since moved to Facedown. All of Strike First's releases are limited edition physical issue, and are made using no plastic, from recycled cardboard.

Dreamt Music

Late in 2007, the label announced a new imprint, the rock-based Dreamt Music. Dreamt Music focuses more on Christian Alternative and Classic Rock unlike its Christian Metal counterparts Facedown and Strike First Records. See Dreamt Artists for list of Dreamt Music signed artists.

Facedown Fest
Since 2000, the label also hosts an annual two-day "Facedown Fest" in southern California. The rock festival is usually made up of the entire Facedown and Strike First rosters. It has been the site of final performances by xDisciplex A.D., and xDEATHSTARx, Seventh Star, and served as the introduction of xLooking Forwardx to Facedown fans, prior to the band signing with the label.  The popularity of the Fest has grown, and in November 2005, an additional two days were held in Annapolis, Maryland for the convenience of those in the eastern part of the U.S. who cannot easily make it to California. For 2017's Facedown Fest, and to celebrate their 20th anniversary, the label is hosting the festival as a three-day event, with old acts such as A Plea for Purging, Bloodlined Calligraphy and xLooking Forwardx and new acts such as Nothing Left and Comrades. The 20th anniversary had many notable acts, including Impending Doom, Sinai Beach, Gideon, Hands and War of Ages.

Roster

Current
 American Arson
Bloodlines
 Comrades
 Confessions of a Traitor
 Deathbreaker
 Dens 
 Everything in Slow Motion
 Extol
 Fallstar
 Fleshkiller
 For All Eternity
 HolyName
 My Epic
 Northlander
 Nothing Left
 Saving Grace
 War of Ages
 Weathered
 What We Do in Secret

Past
 A Hope for Home (unsigned)
 A Plea for Purging
 Abel (Dreamt Music) 
 Ace Augustine (Strike First Records) (previously signed to Red Cord Records) 
 Anchor 
 Alove for Enemies (members in Letter to the Exiles)
 Altars (unsigned)
 Anam Cara (member also in Twelve Gauge Valentine)
 Ark of the Covenant (unsigned)
 As Hell Retreats (signed to Ain't No Grave Records)
 Attalus
 Bloodlined Calligraphy (Strike First Records)
 Bloody Sunday 
 Brutal Fight (Strike First Records)
 Born Blind
 The Burial
 Call to Preserve 
 Ceasefire
 Clear Convictions (Strike First Records) (unsigned)
 Colossus
 Comeback Kid (currently signed to Victory Records)
 Counting The Days (Strike First Records)
 The Deal (reunited in November 2008)
 Demise of Eros (Strike First Records; one member went on to join Once Nothing and Haste the Day)
 Dogwood (currently on Roadside Records)
 Dynasty (unsigned)
 Dodgin' Bullets 
 Earth from Above
 Falling Cycle (one member went on to join Sinai Beach)
 Figure Four (two members are also in Comeback Kid)
 Flee the Seen
 For Today (previously signed to Nuclear Blast Records)
 Gideon (currently on Equal Vision Records)
 The Great Commission (signed to Ain't No Grave Records)
 Hands (Shane Ochsner in Everything in Slow Motion)
 Hanover Saints (one member in Union Hearts)
 Hit The Deck (Strike First Records)
 Hope for the Dying
 Immortal Souls (signed to Rottweiler Records)
 Impending Doom (signed to E1 Music)
 In Due Time (Strike First Records)
 Indwelling (members now in Overcome)
 Inked in Blood 
 In the Midst of Lions
 Jesus Wept (Strike First Records)
 Kingston Falls  
 Leaders (last show on June 27, 2015)
 Letter to the Exiles 
 Means
 Messengers (unsigned, members in Modern Pain, Heretic, Hollow Point, Never In Ruin)
 No Innocent Victim
 Nodes of Ranvier
 Nothing Til Blood (Strike First, unsigned)
 One-21 
 Opposition of One (Strike First Records)
 Onward to Olympas (one member went on to join Forevermore)
 Overcome
 Point of Recognition 
 Poured Out
 The Redemption Song (Strike First Records)
 The Rekoning
 Remove the Veil 
 Rival Choir (formerly Mouth of the South)
 Seventh Star
 Shapes Stars Make (Dreamt Music) (currently unsigned)
 Silence the Epilogue (Strike First Records)
 Sinai Beach
 Sleep for Sleepers (Dreamt Music) (member in The Wandering Tree)
 Sleeping Giant 
 Symphony in Peril
 Take It Back! (Currently signed to Wrong Ones Records)
 This Runs Through (members are now in Sleepwave and To Speak of Wolves)
 Through Solace
 Thieves & Liars (Dreamt Music)
 Those Who Fear
 Today Forever (Strike First Records)
 Torn in Two (changed their name to Red Red, playing local shows)
 Trauma (Strike First Records)
 We the Gathered (Strike First Records)
 Within (Strike First Records)
 Wrench in the Works
 xDEATHSTARx
 xDISCIPLEx A.D. (members went on to form Jesus Wept)
 xLooking Forwardx
 Your Memorial

See also
Facedown Records discography

References

External links

American record labels
Christian record labels
Hardcore record labels
Heavy metal record labels
Christian hardcore